Antistathmoptera is a genus of moths in the family Saturniidae first described by Tams in 1935.

Species
The genus includes the following species:

Antistathmoptera daltonae Tams, 1935
Antistathmoptera elegans Darge, 2015

References

Saturniinae
Moth genera